Ked, is a village located in Jhunjhunu district Rajasthan situated on the banks of Katli river. It was an independent State and Joint State of kekri Ruled By Pala (Gaur) Rajputs and this region is also known as Gaurati the land of Gaurs.

References

Villages in Jhunjhunu district